Trevor Wilkinson may refer to:
Trevor Wilkinson (squash player) (born 1960), South African squash player
Trevor Wilkinson (1923-2008), founder of the sports car manufacturers TVR